The Lancaster Symphony Orchestra is a local orchestra in Lancaster, Pennsylvania. It performs year-round at the city's historical Fulton Opera House and consists of many highly talented musicians from around the area.
It is a member of the American Symphony Orchestra League and is a class 5 orchestra with a budget that exceeds $1 million per year.

History 
The Lancaster Symphony Orchestra made its official debut on May 1, 1947, at McCaskey High School Auditorium (Lancaster, Pennsylvania) under the baton of Conductor Louis Vyner. Ticket prices ranged from $1.20 to $2.40 per person. The concert earned several standing ovations and the entire affair earned a profit of $236.

    Prior efforts to create a hometown orchestra were derailed by two world wars and one national economic depression. After the end of World War II, however, the community felt ready to support a local symphony. Efforts to establish the Lancaster Symphony were spearheaded by several community leaders. Chief among them was Armstrong World Industries executive Kenneth O. Bates, who became the first Board president.

    During his board service, Bates and fellow board member Cameron Hawley (who later claimed fame as a noted author) developed the idea of the Composer’s Award. The idea captured national attention, and remains a Lancaster Symphony feature bringing outstanding contemporary American composers to Lancaster annually. Past award recipients have included Leroy Anderson, Morton Gould, and Russell Peck.

    Now in its 60th season, the Lancaster Symphony Orchestra has played for over two decades under the direction of Maestro Stephen Gunzenhauser. The Symphony has evolved from a community orchestra playing a few concerts per year into a $1.7 million organization of professional musicians presenting six classic series concerts, Sounds of the Season holiday concert series, a New Year's Eve Celebration concert, an Audience Requests Concert series, and a free Patriotic Concert on the July 4th holiday. The concerts feature international guest artists and conductors, and pre-concert lectures. Opening Night Friday audiences are also treated to a post-concert reception where they can interact with the Symphony’s musicians and guest artists.

    The Symphony's education program, Sound Discovery, features the nationally recognized “Open Rehearsals with Lido.” Developed exclusively for the Lancaster Symphony Orchestra, this interactive experience introduces classical music into the lives of students and adults throughout Lancaster County. Sound Discovery’s programs also include the Music Discovery Experience, a program serving the School District of Lancaster, Symphonic Concerts for Children, Xtreme Close-ups, Instrumental Competition/Scholarship, the Gift of Music, and Master Classes.

    The orchestra is managed by a professional staff; orchestra personnel are contracted for each series. The Symphony rents the historic Fulton Theatre for its performances; additional performances are held at the American Music Theatre,  Winter Center, and The Ware Center. Its offices are located at 226 North Arch Street in downtown Lancaster.

Sound Discovery Music Education Programs

Open rehearsals with Lido

At the Symphony's interactive open rehearsals, Lido, an animated conductor's baton, is projected on two screens adjacent to the orchestra.  Lido leads attendees through the rehearsal (as the music is being played) by means of a PowerPoint presentation.  At times Lido will lend his personal opinion about the music as well. Lido serves as an effective means to make the rehearsal fun and enjoyable for children and adults alike.

Notable guest artists
Christopher Pfund, Gwynne Geyer, Laszlo Fenyo, Veri & Jamanis, Igor Yuzefovich, Odin Rathman, Michael Jamanis, Mauricio Gonzalas, Janine Thomas, Jonathan Carney

Sources 
Official website http://www.lancastersymphony.org/

https://web.archive.org/web/20100911141945/http://www.lcmincpa.org/historyandcurriculum.html

Musical groups established in 1947
1947 establishments in Pennsylvania
Orchestras based in Pennsylvania
Culture of Lancaster, Pennsylvania